Now Pashan (also Romanized as Now Pāshān; also known as Now Pūshān) is a village in Ziabar Rural District, in the Central District of Sowme'eh Sara County, Gilan Province, Iran. At the 2006 census, its population was 275, in 79 families.

References 

Populated places in Sowme'eh Sara County